Taimei Kawai, better known by his stage name Carpainter, is a Japanese electronic musician.

He started composing future garage in 2012 and released his debut EP on his label Trekkie Trax, which he launched with his brother Seimei and other DJs. Carpainter has also produced EPs for other labels such as Maltine Records, Top Billin, L2S, Heka Trax, and Activia Benz and released an album of his own work, Out Of Resistance.

He was born in Kawasaki, Kanagawa, Japan and lived in the Netherlands.

Discography

Albums
 Out of Resistance (Trekkie Trax, 2015)
 Returning (Trekkie Trax, 2017)

Singles and EPs
 "Carpainter (2012)
 "Double Rainbow" (2013)
 "Gravity Fails" (2013)
 "War Dub from the New World" (2013)
 "Jubilate" (2014)
 "Saltflake Snow" (2014)
 "Digital Harakiri" (2015)
 "Amazing!!!" (with Maxo) (2015)
 "BrokY" (2015)
 "Noble Arts" (2016)
 "Browser Crasher" (2016)
 "Geofront" (2016)
 "Go to Work feat. TT the Artist" (2017)
 "Orange Wind" (2017)
 "PAM feat. Onjuicy" (2017)
 "Changeling Life" (2017)
 "Declare Victory" (2019)

References

External links
Trekkie Trax

Living people
People from Kawasaki, Kanagawa
Japanese record producers
Japanese electronic musicians
Japanese DJs
Club DJs
Remixers
Future garage musicians
Electronic dance music DJs
Year of birth missing (living people)